In algebraic topology, the fundamental groupoid is a certain topological invariant of a topological space. It can be viewed as an extension of the more widely-known fundamental group; as such, it captures information about the homotopy type of a topological space. In terms of category theory, the fundamental groupoid is a certain functor from the category of topological spaces to the category of groupoids.

Definition 
Let  be a topological space. This allows for a generalisation of the Van Kampen theorem using two base points to compute the fundamental group of the circle.

As suggested by its name, the fundamental groupoid of  naturally has the structure of a groupoid. The fact that this satisfies the definition of a category amounts to the standard fact that the equivalence class of the concatenation of two paths only depends on the equivalence classes of the individual paths. Likewise, the fact that this category is a groupoid, which asserts that every morphism is invertible, amounts to the standard fact that one can reverse the orientation of a path, and the equivalence class of the resulting concatenation contains the constant path.

Basic properties

Bundles of groups and local systems
In order to be a functor, these group homomorphisms are required to be compatible with the topological structure, so that homotopic paths with fixed endpoints define the same homomorphism; furthermore the group homomorphisms must compose in accordance with the concatenation and inversion of paths. One can define homology with coefficients in a bundle of abelian groups.

When  satisfies certain conditions, a local system can be equivalently described as a locally constant sheaf.

Examples 
 The fundamental groupoid of the singleton space is the trivial groupoid (a groupoid with one object * and one morphism }

The homotopy hypothesis 
The homotopy hypothesis, a well-known conjecture in homotopy theory formulated by Alexander Grothendieck, states that a suitable generalization of the fundamental groupoid, known as the fundamental ∞-groupoid, captures all information about a topological space up to weak homotopy equivalence.

References 
Ronald Brown. Topology and groupoids. Third edition of Elements of modern topology [McGraw-Hill, New York, 1968]. With 1 CD-ROM (Windows, Macintosh and UNIX). BookSurge, LLC, Charleston, SC, 2006. xxvi+512 pp. 
 Brown, R., Higgins, P. J. and Sivera, R., Nonabelian algebraic topology: filtered spaces, crossed complexes, cubical homotopy groupoids. Tracts in Mathematics Vol 15. European Mathematical Society  (2011). (663+xxv pages) 

J. Peter May. A concise course in algebraic topology. Chicago Lectures in Mathematics. University of Chicago Press, Chicago, IL, 1999. x+243 pp. 
 Edwin H. Spanier. Algebraic topology. Corrected reprint of the 1966 original. Springer-Verlag, New York-Berlin, 1981. xvi+528 pp. 
 George W. Whitehead. Elements of homotopy theory. Graduate Texts in Mathematics, 61. Springer-Verlag, New York-Berlin, 1978. xxi+744 pp.

External links 
 The website of Ronald Brown, a prominent author on the subject of groupoids in topology: http://groupoids.org.uk/
 
 

Higher category theory
Algebraic topology